Charles Wellington Fisher (August 4, 1866 – May 5, 1919) was a Canadian politician who served as the first Speaker of the Legislative Assembly of Alberta.

Biography 

Born in Hyde Park, Ontario, now part of London, Ontario. Fisher came to Cochrane from Ontario in 1899, and became the town's leading merchant. In 1907 he married a niece of the Carling family (of Carling Brewery fame), and promised her that they would live in a castle. By way of fulfilling that promise, he built a mansion in Cochrane in 1908 (which became the Just Home Guest Ranch in 1931 and was donated to a Franciscan order in 1948).

In January 1903, Arthur Sifton, the Member of the Legislative Assembly of the Northwest Territories for Banff resigned to become territorial chief justice. In the ensuing by-election, held February 4, Fisher defeated H. J. Richardson to replace him. He served until the district left the Northwest Territories to become part of the new province of Alberta in 1905.

He ran in Banff in Alberta's inaugural election. Politics in the North-West Territories had been conducted on a non-partisan basis but that was not the case in Alberta after provincehood. Fisher aligned himself with the Liberals. In the election, he faced Conservative Robert Brett, who had been Banff's NWT territorial Assemblyman from 1891 to 1899.  He more than doubled Brett's vote count on his way to an easy victory.

Fisher was part of a Liberal majority of 23 seats in the 25 seat Legislative Assembly of Alberta, and was one of only seven members with previous legislative experience. In deference to this experience, and as a reward for having beaten Brett, considered a strong opponent, he was elected the first Speaker of the Legislative Assembly of Alberta on March 15, 1906.

He was re-elected in the next three elections, in the new riding of Cochrane, and was re-elected Speaker after each of them. As Speaker, he presided over the tumultuous Alberta and Great Waterways Railway scandal, when he ruled future premier Charles Stewart out of order in his attempt to report a scandalous rumour about fellow Liberal John R. Boyle in the legislature.

Fisher died May 5, 1919, a victim of the 1918 flu pandemic. His death left his Cochrane seat vacant, and in the ensuing by-election the United Farmers of Alberta (UFA) ran a candidate, Alexander Moore, for the first time in their history. He won, and two years later the UFA won a majority government.

Charles Fisher is buried in Calgary's Union Cemetery.

Electoral record

References

Notes

External links 

1866 births
1919 deaths
Alberta Liberal Party MLAs
British emigrants to Canada
Canadian businesspeople
Deaths from Spanish flu
Members of the Legislative Assembly of the Northwest Territories
People from Cochrane, Alberta
Speakers of the Legislative Assembly of Alberta